Xinghua is a county-level city under the administration of Taizhou, Jiangsu province, China. It is located in the central part of Jiangsu Province. It borders the prefecture-level cities of Yancheng to the north and east and Yangzhou to the west.

Xinghua's name is the abbreviation for "" which means "prospering (the Confucian) teaching".

History 
In 920, the Yang Wu state of the Ten Kingdoms separated the northern part of the then Hailing county to establish Xinghua county. The county was downgraded to Zhaoyang township in 1135, but was restored in 1149.

In 1987, the county was turned into a city of Yangzhou. The area was under the jurisdiction of Yangzhou until 1996, and then reassign to Taizhou, Jiangsu.

Administrative divisions
In the present, Xinghua City has 29 towns and 5 townships.
29 towns

5 townships

Climate

Education 
Chushui Experimental School

Notable people 
Bi Feiyu, fiction writer
Fan Zhongyan, politician, was once magistrate in Xinghua
Hou Yifan, chess grandmaster, born in Xinghua
Kong Shangren, Qing dynasty dramatist and poet
Li Jitong (1897–1961), botanist and phytophysiologist
Zheng Banqiao, Qing dynasty painter

See also 
 Xinghua Campaign

References

External links
  Official Local Government website
  "Illustrated Album of Yangzhou Prefecture", from 1573 to 1620, has illustrations of Xinghua

 
Cities in Jiangsu
County-level divisions of Jiangsu
Taizhou, Jiangsu